Alucita panolbia is a moth in the family Alucitidae. It is found in Guatemala.

The wingspan is about 19 mm. The antennae are whitish. The head is whitish ochreous, mottled with brownish fuscous. The thorax is brownish fuscous, the tegulae tipped with whitish ochreous. The forewings have a mottled appearance.

References

Moths described in 1915
Alucitidae
Lepidoptera of the Caribbean
Moths of Central America